Richard Brouillette is a Canadian film producer, director, editor and programmer.

Biography 
Starting as a film critic for the Montreal weekly, Voir (1989), he then worked for Québec’s top independent distribution company, Cinéma Libre (1989–1999), which has since folded. In 1993, he founded the artist-run centre Casa Obscura, a multidisciplinary exhibition space.  Here, he still runs a weekly cine-club called Les projections libérantes, for which he is also the projectionist. He has produced and directed three feature length documentary films and has directed two experimental short films. He has also produced several feature-length films, mostly documentaries.

Filmography

as director, editor and scriptwriter 
 1995: Too Much is Enough (Trop c'est assez)
 1995: Carpe diem (segment of the featurelenght group film Un film de cinéastes)
 2008: Encirclement - Neo-Liberalism Ensnares Democracy (L'Encerclement - La démocratie dans les rets du néolibéralisme)
 2008: Adagio for a Biker (Adagio pour un gars de bicycle, by Pascale Ferland, as co-scriptwriter)
 2014: Prends garde à la douceur des choses (commissioned by Visions du réel)
 2015: Uncle Bernard: A Counter-Lesson in Economics (Oncle Bernard – L'anti-leçon d'économie)
 2017: The Dispossessed (Les dépossédés, by Mathieu Roy, as co-scriptwriter)
 2018: Dispossession (Dépossession, by Mathieu Roy, as co-scriptwriter)

as producer 
 1995: Too Much is Enough (Trop c'est assez)
 2005: Tree with Severed Branches (L’Arbre aux branches coupées, by Pascale Ferland, as executive producer)
 2006: Barbers - A Men's Story (Barbiers – Une histoire d’hommes, by Claude Demers, as executive producer)
 2007: Les désoeuvrés, by René Bail, as executive producer
 2008: Adagio for a Biker (Adagio pour un gars de bicycle, by Pascale Ferland, as executive producer)
 2008: Encirclement - Neo-Liberalism Ensnares Democracy (L'Encerclement - La démocratie dans les rets du néolibéralisme)
 2009: Ladies in Blue (Les dames en bleu, by Claude Demers, as executive producer)
 2009: Chantier, by René Bail, as executive producer
 2015: Uncle Bernard: A Counter-Lesson in Economics (Oncle Bernard – L'anti-leçon d'économie)
 2016: Far Away Lands (Les terres lointaines, by Félix Lamarche, as advising producer/executive producer)
 2017: The Dispossessed (Les dépossédés, by Mathieu Roy, as executive producer)
 2017: The Hidden River (La rivière cachée, by Jean-François Lesage, as executive producer)
 2018: Dispossession (Dépossession, by Mathieu Roy, as executive producer)
 2018: Dark Suns (Soleils noirs, by Julien Elie, as executive producer)
 2020: Prayer for a Lost Mitten (Prière pour une mitaine perdue) (by Jean-François Lesage, as executive producer)

Awards 

 1996: M. Joan Chalmers Award for best Canadian documentary
 2009: Robert and Frances Flaherty Prize (Grand Prize) (11th Yamagata International Documentary Film Festival)
 2009: Grand Prize (15th Visions du réel festival)
 2009: Audience Award for Best feature film (6th IndieLisboa festival)
 2009: Pierre and Yolande Perrault Award for best emerging documentary filmmaker (27th Rendez-vous du cinéma québécois)
 2009: La Vague Award for Best documentary film (ex aequo with Hommes à louer, by Rodrigue Jean) (23rd Festival international du cinéma francophone en Acadie
 2009: Special Jury Mention for the Amnesty International Award (6th IndieLisboa festival)
 2014: Award from Conseil des arts et des lettres du Québec for best artist of the year in Mauricie
 2015: La Vague Award for Best documentary film (29th Festival international du cinéma francophone en Acadie)

External links 

 
 Les films du passeur

Canadian documentary film directors
Canadian film critics
Canadian film editors
Canadian documentary film producers
Living people
Year of birth missing (living people)